Chong-Sary-Oy is a village in the Issyk-Kul Region of Kyrgyzstan. It is part of the Issyk-Kul District. Its population was 3,328 in 2021. This village marks the road and hiking border crossing between Kyrgyzstan and Kazakhstan known as Pereval Ozernyy. Its Kazakh counterpart is Almaty.

References

Populated places in Issyk-Kul Region
Kazakhstan–Kyrgyzstan border crossings